Voacristine is a indole alkaloid occurring in Voacanga and Tabernaemontana genus. It is also an iboga type alkaloid.

Chemistry 
Its structure is almost similar to voacangine, an alkaloid used in semi-synthesis of ibogaine. Compared to voacangine, it has an extra O-atom. When it is degraded, iboxygaine and ibogaine are formed.

Sources 
Voacristine is found in multiple species of Tabernaemontana some of which are Tabernaemontana divaricata, Tabernaemontana heyneana, Tabernaemontana ventricosa and in Voacanga africana.

See also 
 Heyneanine
 Voacamine
 Vobasine

References 

Tryptamine alkaloids